Johann Friedrich Thyssen (1 October 1804 in Aachen – 25 May 1877 in Eschweiler) was a German banker and patriarch of the Thyssen family dynasty.

Family
He was the son of Nikolaus Thyssen and wife Christine Nellessen. His family had settled in rural Aachen in the 18th century. 
He married in Aachen on 1 October 1838 his cousin Katharina Thyssen.

Career
He was the initiator of the Thyssen fortune and the father of August Thyssen and Joseph Thyssen, both of whom joined his bank.

See also
 Thyssen
 Thyssen family

External links
 Ancestors of Baroness Francesca Anne Thyssen-Bornemisza de Kaszon
 Ancestors of Archduchess Eleonore of Austria
 Ancestors of Archduke Ferdinand of Austria
 Ancestors of Archduchess Gloria of Austria
 

1804 births
1877 deaths
People from Aachen
German bankers
Friedrich Thyssen
19th-century German businesspeople